Christine Buci-Glucksmann is a French philosopher and Professor Emeritus from University of Paris VIII specializing in the aesthetics of the Baroque and Japan, and computer art. Her best-known work in English is Baroque Reason: The Aesthetics of Modernity.

Background

Christine Buci-Glucksmann began her career as a philosopher in the 1970s with studies of Friedrich Engels and Antonio Gramsci. She followed this research into aesthetics, based primarily around the works of Walter Benjamin. From this foundation she researched the aesthetics of the perception of the Baroque, which was published as "La Raison baroque" in 1984 and with La folie du voir in 1986. She cited Gilles Deleuze and Jean-François Lyotard as being most influential in guiding her research into Baroque aesthetics.

Later she investigated the aesthetics of the virtual with two books: La folie du voir: Une esthétique du virtuel and Esthetique De L'ephemere. She has written numerous books and articles about digital art (for example L'art à l'époque virtuel (Art in the Age of Virtuality)) and new media art. She has also written extensively on artists from China, for in example in Les modernités chinoises.

Bibliography

Books 
In translation:

 Baroque Reason: The Aesthetics of Modernity (translated by Patrick Camiller). London / Thousand Oaks, Calif., Sage, 1994. 
 Gramsci and the State (translated  by David Fernbach). London, Lawrence and Wishart, 1980. 

In French:

L'art à l'époque virtuel, Arts 8, L'Harmattan, 2004
Esthetique de l'éphemère, Galilée, 2003, 
La folie du voir: Une esthétique du virtuel, Galilée, 2002
Histoire Florale De La Peinture: Hommage à Steve Dawson, Galilée, 2002, 
L'esthétique du Temps au Japon: Du Zen au Rituel, Galilée, 2000, 
Peinture, Trois Regards (Christine Buci-Glucksmann, Eric De Chassey, Catherine Perret), Ėditions du Regard, 2000, 
Les Frontières Esthétiques de l'Art, L'Harmattan, 1999,   
L'Oeil Cartographique de L'art, Galilée, 1996, 
L'enjeu du Beau: Musique et Passion, Galilée, 1992, 
Tragique de l'Ombre: Shakespeare et le Maniérisme, Galilée, 1990, 
(with Fabrice Revault d'Allonnes) Raoul Ruiz, Dis Voir, 1987, 
Imaginaires de L'autre: Khatibi et la Mémoire Littéraire, L'Harmattan, 1987, 
La Folie du Voir: De L'esthétique Baroque, Galilée, 1986, 
La Raison Baroque: De Baudelaire à Benjamin, Galilée, 1984, 
Ouverture d'une Discussion: Dix Interventions à La Rencontre des 400 Intellectuels à Vitry, F. Maspero, 1978, 
Gramsci et l'Ėtat: Pour Une Théorie Materialiste de la Philosophie, Fayard, 1975,

Essays

 "Eurydice et les scènes de la peinture." Verso No. 8 (1997).
 "The Eurydices." Parallax Parallax No.10 (1999).
 "Images d'absence." Les Cahiers des Regards (1993).
 "Images of Absence in the Inner Space of Painting," in Inside the Visible. Ed. C. De Zegher. (MIT Press, 1996).
 "Inner Space of Painting," in Bracha L. Ettinger: Halala—Autistwork. (The Israel Museum, 1995).
 "L'oeil nomade et critique," in L'oeil cartographique de l'art. (Galilée, 1996).

References

External links

Year of birth missing (living people)
Living people
Academic staff of Paris 8 University Vincennes-Saint-Denis
Philosophers of art
Continental philosophers
French women philosophers
French art critics
French art curators
Postmodern theory
20th-century French philosophers
21st-century French philosophers
20th-century French women writers
21st-century French women writers
French women art critics
French women curators